Ēbn-Ōzn (pronounced EEBEN-OHZEN) was an American, 1980s New York based experimental New Wave synth pop duo, composed of Ned "Ebn" Liben (synthesizer) and Robert "Ozn" Rosen (organ, vocals). The duo who pioneered the sound recording technique of "sampling",  is best known for the 1983 hit single and award-winning music video "AEIOU Sometimes Y", the first commercial American single recorded entirely on a computer.

Career
Ēbn-Ōzn formed in 1981 in New York City when Rosen met Liben through record producer and recording artist Jay Aaron Podolnick (who later founded Villa Muse Studios in Austin, Texas), a friend of Ozn's Australian fashion-model girlfriend. Soon after meeting, they started spending time together in clubs listening to different types of dance music. Ozn was a Broadway actor/singer in the original casts of Shenandoah and Marlowe and had just come off the road from a tour of The Pirates of Penzance with Karla DeVito.  Ebn was owner of New York's Sundragon Recording Studios, which he created at the age of 14, and was a founding member of the guitar band Riff Raff (Atco/Warner Brothers). In 1983 they were signed to the London arm of Arista Records-Ariola by A&R wunderkind Simon Potts and to Elektra Records in New York by Bob Krasnow, who released their only LP, Feeling Cavalier, and singles "AEIOU Sometimes Y" and "Bag Lady (I Wonder)".  The album featured a wide range of musical styles and a sense of humor throughout; it also featured Latin jazz percussion musician Tito Puente.

"AEIOU" became an international MTV and dance club hit, reaching #20 on the Billboard Club Chart.  The single also received significant black radio play and remains a New Wave radio and 1980s music staple. AllMusic writes that the song "combines intelligence, melody, and weirdness in just the right doses. Accompanied by a video that featured the multi-braided Rosen delivering a stream-of-consciousness rap about 'this incredible Swedish girl,' and with a more serious subtext about communication, it became a bizarre club music hit."

Recorded in 1981, "AEIOU" has the distinction of being the first commercial single ever recorded entirely on a computer (a Fairlight CMI) in the United States and the subsequent album, Feeling Cavalier, the first such album. 
 
The second single was the uncharacteristically earnest dance-rock track "Bag Lady", the video for which starred Emmy- and Tony Award-winning actress Imogene Coca.  The single became a dance club hit, reaching the Top 40 on the Billboard Club Chart, and a minor radio hit in the US, while gaining hit status in Canada and Europe.

"AEIOU Sometimes Y" was the focus of a Beavis and Butt-head episode in the 1990s, and has been released on numerous "Best of the '80s" compilation albums. Feeling Cavalier was released on CD on October 17, 2006, by Wounded Bird Records.

Breakup and subsequent activities
The duo went their separate ways in 1985. Ebn went on to work with Scritti Politti and producers Phil Ramone and Arif Mardin.  Ozn formed House music act Dada Nada, released on his own label, One Voice Records.  Dada Nada was signed to Polydor/London and distributed independently in North America by Ozn.

Ned "Ebn" Liben died in 1998 of a heart attack in Manhattan, New York, and is survived by his widow Sallie Moore Liben and son Max. Robert "Ozn" Rosen officially changed his name to Robert Ozn and went on to become a Hollywood script analyst, award-winning screenwriter and producer.

References

External links
 Ebn Ozn on Myspace

American new wave musical groups
Electronic music groups from New York (state)
American musical duos
Electronic music duos